Ethan Kleinberg is Class of 1958 Distinguished Professor of History and Letters at Wesleyan University,  Editor-in-Chief of History and Theory and was Director of Wesleyan University's Center for the Humanities. Kleinberg's wide-ranging scholarly work spans across the fields of history, philosophy, comparative literature and religion. Together with Joan Wallach Scott and Gary Wilder he is a member of the Wild On Collective who co-authored the "Theses on Theory and History" and started the #TheoryRevolt movement.
He is the author of Haunting History: for a deconstructive approach to the past and Generation Existential: Martin Heidegger’s Philosophy in France, 1927-61, which was awarded the 2006 Morris D. Forkosch prize for the best book in intellectual history, by the Journal of the History of Ideas and co-editor of the volume Presence: Philosophy, History, and Cultural Theory for the Twenty-First Century. He is completing a book length project titled The Myth of Emmanuel Levinas, on the Talmudic Lectures the French-Jewish philosopher Emmanuel Levinas presented in Paris between 1960 and 1990.

Biography 
His research interests include European intellectual history with special interest in France and Germany, critical theory, educational structures, and the philosophy of history.

He received his B.A from UC. Berkeley and his Ph.D. from UCLA.  For high school he attended Windward School in Los Angeles.

In 1998 he was a Fulbright scholar in France. In 2003 he was the recipient of Wesleyan University's Carol A. Baker ’81 Memorial Prize for excellence in teaching and research. In 2006 his book Generation Existential: Heidegger’s Philosophy in France, 1927-1961 was awarded the Morris D. Forkosch prize for the best book in intellectual history by the Journal of the History of Ideas. In 2011 he was Directeur d’études invité at the École des Hautes Études en Sciences Sociales, Paris. In 2018 he was Professeur Invité at the Université Bordeaux Montaigne. He was named the 2020 Reinhart Koselleck Guest Professor at the Center for Theories of History, Bielefeld University.

Bibliography 
Emmanuel Levinas's Talmudic Turn: Philosophy and Jewish Thought (Stanford University Press, 2021)
Haunting History: for a deconstructive approach to the past
Generation Existential: Heiddegger’s Philosophy in France, 1927-1961
Presence: Philosophy, History and Cultural Theory for the 21st Century

Publications
Generation Existential: Heidegger’s Philosophy in France, 1927-1961, 2005 Cornell University Press. Paperback edition, 2007. Chinese translation with author’s foreword (Beijing: New Star Press/Xin Xing, July 2008).
Presence: Philosophy, History and Cultural Theory for the 21st Century, a volume co-edited with Ranjan Ghosh, November 2013, Cornell University Press.
Just the Facts: the Fantasy of a Historical Science, History of the Present: a journal of critical inquiry (University of Illinois Press), Vol. 6, No. 1 (Spring 2016).
History and Theory in a Global Frame, introduction to History and Theory Theme Issue on “Historical Theory in a Global Frame,” co-authored with Vijay Pinch, Volume 54, No. 4, December 2015.
Not Yet Marrano: Levinas, Derrida and the ‘ontology’ of Being-Jewish, in Traces of God: Derrida and Religion, Edward Baring and Peter Gordon eds., October 2014, Fordham University Press.
To Atone and to Forgive: Jaspers, Jankélévitch/Derrida and the possibility of forgiveness in Jankélévitch and Forgiveness, Alan Udoff ed., February 2013, Lexington Press, Rowman and Littlefield.
Academic Journals in the Digital Era: An Editor’s Reflections, Perspectives on History, 50:9/ December 2012.
The Trojan Horse of Tradition, introduction to History and Theory Theme Issue on “Tradition and History”, Volume 51, No. 4, December 2012.
Back to Where We’ve Never Been: Heidegger, Levinas, Derrida on Tradition and History, History and Theory, Volume 51, No. 4, December 2012.
The New Metaphysics of Time, introduction to History and Theory Virtual Issue, August 2012.
In/finite Time:  tracing transcendence to Emmanuel Levinas’s Talmudic lectures, International Journal of Philosophical Studies special issue on Emmanuel Levinas, Volume 20, Number 3 (2012).
Of Jews and Humanism in France, Modern Intellectual History volume 9, Number 2, (August 2012).
The Letter on Humanism: Reading Heidegger in France, in Situating Existentialism, Robert Bernasconi and Jonathan Judaken eds. (June 2012, Columbia University Press).
A Perfect Past? Tony Judt and the Historian’s Burden of Responsibility, French Historical Studies, Volume 35, Number 1 (Winter 2012).
To Atone and to Forgive: Jaspers, Jankélévitch/Derrida and the possibility of forgiveness in Jankélévitch and Forgiveness, Alan Udoff ed. (forthcoming from Lexington Press, Rowman and Littlefield).
Freud and Levinas: Talmud and Psychoanalysis Before the Letter, Freud’s Jewish World, Arnold Richards ed.,  (New York: Macfarland Press, January 2010).
Presence In Absentia in Storia della Storiografia 55 (2009).
Review of François Cusset, French Theory: How Foucault, Derrida, Deleuze, and Co. Transformed the Intellectual Life of the United States, Notre Dame Philosophical Reviews, 2008-09-07
Review essay of Allan Bass, Interpretation and Difference:  The Strangeness of Care (Stanford University Press, 2006), Journal of the American Psychoanalytic Association 56, 3, Fall 2008.
Interdisciplinary Studies at the Crossroads, Liberal Education, 94, no. 1, Winter 2008.
Haunting History: Deconstruction and the Spirit of Revision, History and Theory, 46, no. 4, December 2007.
New Gods Swelling the Future Ocean, History and Theory, 46, no. 3, October 2007.
The Myth of Emmanuel Levinas in After the Deluge: New Perspectives in French Intellectual and Cultural History, Julian Bourg, ed., Lexington Press, Rowman and Littlefield, 2004.
Kojève and Fanon:  The Fact of Blackness and the Desire for Recognition in French Civilization and Its Discontents, Tyler Stovall and George Van Den Abbeele, ed., Lexington Press, Rowman and Littlefield, 2003.

References

External links
 History and Theory: Expanding the Intellectual Network
 Wesleyan History Department
 History and Theory editorial page
 Video of lecture on Freud and Levinas at Center for Jewish History
 Kleinberg's article Interdisciplinary Studies at a Crossroads 
 Kleinberg’s review of Francois Cusset's French Theory
 "Haunting History: Deconstruction and the Spirit of Revision" in History and Theory

See also
Wesleyan biography
 H-net biography
 Columbia biography

Intellectual historians
University of California, Berkeley alumni
University of California, Los Angeles alumni
Critical theorists
Wesleyan University faculty
Living people
Heidegger scholars
Year of birth missing (living people)